James Thomas Rowland (born 3 December 2001) is an English professional footballer who plays as a midfielder for Cymru Premier club Newtown.

Career

Shrewsbury Town
Rowland played youth football with West Bromwich Albion before joining Shrewsbury Town. He made his debut on 13 November 2018 in the group stage of the EFL Trophy, as a 67th-minute substitute for Charlie Colkett in a 2–1 win at Crewe Alexandra.

He was given his first professional contract by Shrewsbury in May 2019.

On 25 January 2020, Rowland joined Aberystwyth Town on loan for the remainder of the 2019–20 season.

He moved on loan to Barwell in October 2020.

On 12 May 2021 it was announced that he would leave Shrewsbury at the end of the season, following the expiry of his contract.

Newtown
Following his release from Shrewsbury, Rowland signed for Cymru Premier side Newtown.

Career statistics

References

2001 births
Living people
English footballers
West Bromwich Albion F.C. players
Shrewsbury Town F.C. players
Association football midfielders
Aberystwyth Town F.C. players
Barwell F.C. players
Newtown A.F.C. players
Cymru Premier players
Southern Football League players
Sportspeople from Walsall